Touqiao may refer to these places in China:

Touqiao, Jiangsu, a town in Yangzhou, Jiangsu
Touqiao Subdistrict, Guiyang, Guizhou